Kurigam is a village in the Indian state of Jammu and Kashmir. It is the nearest village from main town of Qazigund. It is famous for Sufi saints namely, Hazrat Baba Habib Shah Sahab and Hazrat Baba Mueen shah Sahab.  A shrine is built on the grave of Hazrat Baba Habib Shah Sahab and Hazrat Baba Sa'd Shah Sahab whose shrine is in shampora. The grave of Hazrat Baba Mueen Shah Sahab is without a shrine. Whenever a shrine is built, the next day it collapsed due to some spiritual restrictions as per local narrations but on 23 March 2021 Maulana Hafiz Syed Zahid Hussain marked wooden structure around his blessed grave. Hazrat Baba Habib Shah sahab's Urs is celebrated every year as per Kashmiri calendar which comes in March every year.

Kurigam is the birthplace of Sufi Poet Prakash Ram Bhatt.

Transport
Kurigam is linked to Qazigund town by two roads. Railway station Qazigund was situated in Kurigam. A railway line joins Kurigam to other towns.

References 

Villages in Anantnag district